The Fundação de Amparo à Pesquisa do Estado da Bahia (FAPESB) is an organization of the Bahia, Brazil, government devoted to funding of science and technology in the state.

External links
 FAPESB website

Scientific organisations based in Brazil